Paul Schmidt may refer to:
 Paul Schmidt (interpreter) (1899–1970), German diplomatic translator
 Paul Karl Schmidt alias Paul Carell (1911–1997), chief press spokesman for Nazi Germany's Foreign Ministry and later purchaser author
 Paul Felix Schmidt (1916–1984), chess International Master and chess writer
 Paul Schmidt (footballer) (1917–1961), Australian rules footballer
 Paul Schmidt (translator) (1934–1999), American translator, poet, playwright, and essayist
 Paul Schmidt (runner) (born 1931), German middle distance runner
 Paul Schmidt (computer programmer), president of the software company Photodex
 Paul Schmidt (inventor) (1898–1976), German engineer and inventor
 Paul Gerhard Schmidt (1937–2010), German medievalist and professor of medieval Latin philology
 Paul Wilhelm Schmidt (1845–1917), German theologian

See also
 Paul Schmidtberger, author of Design Flaws of the Human Condition